Atlético Ouriense is a women's football club from Ourém, Portugal. The team was promoted to the national top division in 2011–12.  In its first year in the Campeonato Nacional de Futebol Feminino it won the championship outright, ending an eleven-year title sequence by S.U. 1º de Dezembro. The team defended the title in 2014. In August 2014, Atlético Ouriense became the first Portuguese women's football club to qualify to the UEFA Women's Champions League knock-out stage.

Current squad

Titles 
 Campeonato Nacional de Futebol Feminino: 2
2012–13, and 2013–14

UEFA Competition Record

References

External links 
 Official Website

Football clubs in Portugal
Women's football clubs in Portugal
Campeonato Nacional de Futebol Feminino teams